Ulo or Ülo may refer to:

 Ülo, Estonian masculine given name
 Ulaangom Airport IATA code